Events in the year 2020 in Colombia.

Incumbents
 President: Iván Duque Márquez
 Vice President: Marta Lucía Ramírez

Events

April 29
500 Venezuela migrants living in Colombia block a highway in protest of the lockdown due to the COVID-19 pandemic in Colombia. They say the makes it impossible for them to work. There are 1.8 million Venezuelan migrants living in Colombia.
Two dozen Colombians deported from the United States have been found to have coronavirus.
May 7 – Colombia legally exports marijuana seeds to Colorado, the United States.
May 20 – COVID-19 pandemic in Colombia: Colombia reports a record of 752 new cases of the infection in one day, bringing the total to 17,787 with 630 deaths. Most of the cases are in Cartagena de Indias.
May 24 – Two men on the radio program ‘Buenas Tardes con Fabio’ in Valledupar, Cesar Department joke about human trafficking and sexual slavery and may be prosecuted.
May 27 – The United States Army sends a Security Force Assistance Brigade unit to Colombia to train anti-drug forces for a period of four months.
June 4 – Indignation across social media due to the police beating to death of Anderson Arboleda, 21, for not wearing a facemask during the COVID-19 pandemic in Puerto Tejada, Cauca on May 19. His case is being compared to that of George Floyd in the United States.
June 9 – A soldier, Ángel Zúñiga Galicia, removes his uniform and puts down his gun in refusal of an order to remove peasants from their home in Pance, Valle del Cauca Department.
June 25 – Seven soldiers confess to raping a 12-year-old girl from the Embera Katio indigenous group, in the northwestern Risaralda Department.
August 11 – COVID-19 pandemic: There are more than 400,000 confirmed cases and 13,500 deaths.
August 14 – The bodies of four coal miners are found after a cave-in sevendays ago in Sogamoso, Boyacá Department.
August 20 – Colombia requests the extradition of drug lord and paramilitary warlord Salvatore Mancuso, 56, on fears that he may be deported to Italy and released. Mancuso has been convicted over 1,000 murders and other crimes.
August 21 – Two thousand indigenous Arhuaco protest against armed groups who are seizing land in the Sierra Nevada de Santa Marta.
August 22 – Six young people are murdered in Tumaco, Nariño Department. This is the fourth massacre this week.
August 24 – Three miners are rescued after being trapped for five days by a cave-in in Lenguazaque, Cundinamarca Department.
August 25 – The Climate Green Fund of the United Nations donates US$28 million to prevent deforestation in the Amazon rainforest.
August 30 – COVID-19 pandemic: The number of cases passes 600,000.
September 9 – Protests following the death of Javier Ordóñez, 42, at the hands of police leave seven dead and 140 injured in Bogota and Soacha.
September 11 – Protests against police brutality leave ten dead, 209 civilians injured, 194 police injured, and 17 police kiosks burned in Bogotá, Medellín, Cali, and Manizales.
September 16 – A statue of Spanish conquistador Sebastián de Belalcázar is torn down by indigenous Misak in Popayán, Cauca Department in protest of 500 years of slavery and oppression.
November 15 – COVID-19 pandemic: Colombia reports 1,191,634 positive cases, ninth highest number in the world.
December 15 – The United Nations Office of the Commissioner for Human Rights (OHCHR), reported it recorded the deaths of 255 people in 66 massacres in 2020, as well as the killing of 120 human rights defenders.

Sports

Culture
January 7 – The telenovela Amar y vivir premiers on Colombian television.

Deaths

January to March
10 January – Carlos Cuco Rojas, harpist (b. 1954)
16 January – Efraín Sánchez, footballer (b, 1926)
6 February – Jhon Jairo Velásquez, 57, hitman, drug dealer and extortionist (Medellín Cartel); esophageal cancer
26 February 26 – Clementina Vélez, 73, doctor, academic and politician, MP (1990–1991, 1998–2002) and city councillor of Cali (1972–1986, 1992–1997, 2004–2019); heart attack
27 February – Juan Diego González, 39, soccer player (Once Caldas, La Equidad, Philadelphia Union) (body discovered on this date)

April to June
4 May – Álvaro Teherán, 54, basketball player (Baloncesto Málaga, Fort Wayne Fury, KK Olimpija); kidney failure

July to September
5 July – Alexander Balanta, 42, footballer; COVID-19.
24 July – , 89, poet; COVID-19.
15 August – Mercedes Barcha, 87, widow of writer Gabriel García Marquez, dies in Mexico City.
17 August – Massacre of Samaniego in Samaniego, Nariño
Brayan Cuaran
Bairón Patiño
Elian Benavides
Daniel Vargas
Laura Riascos
Joan Quintero
Rubén Ibarra
Óscar Obando
21 August – Antonio Bayter Abud, 86, Roman Catholic prelate, Vicar Apostolic of Inírida (1996–2013).
7 September – Aurelio Iragorri Hormaza, 83, politician, Senator (1991–2014), Governor of Cauca (1975–1976) and President of the Chamber of Representatives (1981–1982).
15 September – , 59, actor (Punto y Raya, Cyrano Fernández).
17 September – Ricardo Ciciliano, 43, footballer (Deportes Tolima, Millonarios, Juan Aurich); pneumonia.

October to December
16 October – Joaquín Pardo, 74, Olympic footballer (1968).
31 October – Horacio Serpa, 77, politician, Minister of Interior (1994–1997), Senator (1985–1988, 2014–2018) and Governor of Santander (2008–2012).
7 November – , 71, actor and stage and film director.
20 November – , 67, vallenato musician and composer; traffic collision.

See also

2020 in the Caribbean
2020 in Central America
COVID-19 pandemic in Colombia
2020 in politics and government
2020s
2020s in political history
List of George Floyd protests outside the United States

References

 
2020s in Colombia
Years of the 21st century in Colombia
Colombia
Colombia